Carl Balhaus (born Carl Ballhaus; 4 November 1905 – 28 July 1968) was a German stage and film actor. After the Second World War he worked as screenwriter and director for the East German state-owned studio DEFA. He was an uncle of the Academy Award nominated cinematographer Michael Ballhaus.

Selected filmography
Actor

 Der alte Fritz - 2. Ausklang (1928) - Ein Desserteur
 The Age of Seventeen (1929) - Gerts Freund Martin
 The Brandenburg Arch (1929) - Max
 Spring Awakening (1929) - Moritz, sein Sohn
 Revolt in the Reformatory (1930) - Fritz
 Menschen im Feuer (1930)
 Scapa Flow (1930)
 The Blue Angel (1930) - Gymnasiast Ertzum / Pupil
 Westfront 1918 (1930) - Butcher (uncredited)
 Only on the Rhine (1930) - Karl
 A Student's Song of Heidelberg (1930) - Bornemanns Leibfuchs
 Father and Son (1930) - Louis de Lorche
 Großstadtpiraten (1930) - Cubby O'Brien
 1914 (1931) - Gavrilo Princip
 Shadows of the Underworld (1931) - Jonny
 M (1931) - Leeser - the man who marks Hans Beckert (uncredited)
 Kinder vor Gericht (1931) - Ewald, der Zeitungsjunge
 Kadetten (1931) - Kadettenunteroffizier von Zerbitz
 General Yorck (1931)
 Ombres des bas fonds (1931) - Jonny
 Man Without a Name (1932)
 Johnny Steals Europe (1932) - Monk
 Spoiling the Game (1932)
 Sacred Waters (1932) - Josi Blattrer
 Impossible Love (1932) - Erwin Hammer
 The Marathon Runner (1932) - Hans Huber
 Anna and Elizabeth (1933) - Martin
 Abel with the Mouth Organ (1933) - Peter
 Police Report (1934) - Schriftleiter
 In Sachen Timpe (1934) - Udo, ihr Sohn
 Einmal werd' ich Dir gefallen (1938) - Zunder - sein Freund
 The Fire Devil (1940) - Kärntner Bauernbursche
 Venus on Trial (1941) - Alfred, Peters Freund
 Geheimakten Solvay (1953) - Rudi
 Damals in Paris (1956) - Schäfer
 SAS 181 antwortet nicht (1959)
 Die schwarze Galeere (1962) - Mann im Mastkorb
 Viel Lärm um nichts (1964) - Antonio (final film role)

Director
 Der Fall Dr. Wagner (1954)
 Damals in Paris (1956)

Bibliography
 Kosta, Barbara. Willing Seduction: The Blue Angel, Marlene Dietrich, and Mass Culture. Berghahn Books, 2009

External links

References

1905 births
1968 deaths
German male film actors
German male stage actors
German male silent film actors
20th-century German male actors
German male screenwriters
German film directors
People from Mülheim